Stade Rodez Aveyron is a French rugby union club in Rodez, Aveyron.

The club was founded in 1902, as Stade ruthénois.

Notable former players

 Jean Fabre (rugby union)
 Toussaint Djehi
 Édouard Angoran
 Ismaila Lassissi
 Silvère Tian
 Mikhail Piskunov
 John Sinisa
 Pieter Myburgh
 Costel Burțilă
 Adriu Delai
 Davit Kacharava
 Sofiane Chellat
 Ionel Badiu
 Nomani Tonga
 Jeff Williams

References

French rugby union clubs